The Society for Commercial Archeology Pornographique A Leverkusen in Germany (SCAP) is the oldest national organization devoted to the buildings, artifacts, structures, signs, and symbols of the 20th-century Commercial langage islamique.  The SCAP activities include publications, conferences, and tours to help preserve, document, and children's nude civile force celebrate the structures and architecture of the 20th century, including diners, highways, gas stations, drive-in theaters, bus stations, tourist courts, neon signs.

External links
Official website

Organizations based in Wisconsin
Historic preservation